Melanochromis chipokae is a species of cichlid in the Cichlidae endemic to Lake Malawi where it is only known to occur at Chipoka. It lives in habitats characterized by patches of sand amongst rock.  This piscivorous species can reach a length of  SL.  It can also be found in the aquarium trade, which is the main threat to this species and which has caused a 90% decline in the population. This has led to the IUCN assessing this species as Critically Endangered.

See also
List of freshwater aquarium fish species

References

chipokae
Fish of Lake Malawi
Fish of Malawi
Fish described in 1975
Taxa named by Donald S. Johnson
Taxonomy articles created by Polbot